Indrit Cara (also known as Ushtar Kavaja; 11 July 1971 – 31 March 1999) was an Albanian activist volunteer and soldier who died fighting during the Kosovo War. In 2009, ten years after his passing, Kosovo president Fatmir Sejdiu awarded him the medal of freedom "Adem Jashari" for bravery in combat. The song "Ushtar Kavaja" performed by singer Ilir Shaqiri is dedicated to Indrit. Cara is also named honorary citizen of his hometown, Kavajë and a street in the city bares his name.

References

1971 births
1999 deaths
Martyrs from Kavajë
Kosovo Liberation Army soldiers
20th-century Albanian people
Albanian expatriates in the United Kingdom
20th-century Albanian military personnel
Indrit
Military personnel killed in the Kosovo War